A saline seep is seep of saline water, with an area of alkali salt crystals that form when the salty water reaches the surface and evaporates.  Various types of water movement form saline seeps, including capillary action from a water table under the surface, and a water table being brought to the surface in a flow.

Habitat 
Biota adapted to saline conditions, often endemic, thrive in the specialized habitat.

Agriculture 
Saline seeps are considered detrimental for agriculture, as they may reduce yields and restrict growth.

See also 
Salinity
Soil salinity
Soil salination
Brackish water
Spring (hydrosphere)

References 

Springs (hydrology)
Salt flats
Hydrogeology
Soil